The 2022–23 Washington Huskies men's basketball team will represent the University of Washington in the 2022–23 NCAA Division I men's basketball season. The Huskies, led by sixth-year head coach Mike Hopkins, will play their home games at Alaska Airlines Arena at Hec Edmundson Pavilion in Seattle, Washington as members of the Pac-12 Conference.

Previous season
The Huskies finished the 2021–22 season 17–15, 11–9 in Pac-12 play to finish in a three-way tie for fifth place. As the No. 6 seed in the Pac-12 tournament, they defeated Utah in the first round before losing to USC in the quarterfinals.

Offseason

Departures

Incoming transfers

2022 recruiting class

 
 
 
Source

Roster

Schedule and results

|-
!colspan=12 style=|Regular season

|-
!colspan=12 style=|Regular season

|- 
!colspan=12 style=| PAC-12 Tournament

Rankings

References

Washington Huskies men's basketball seasons
Washington
Washington Huskies basketball, men
Washington Huskies basketball, men
Washington Huskies basketball, men
Washington Huskies basketball, men